Cataclysm is derived from the Greek , 'down, against', and , 'wash over, surge'. It may refer to:

Common meanings
Generally, any large-scale disaster
Deluge (mythology)
Doomsday event, see hypothetical risks to civilization, humans, and planet Earth
A catastrophic natural event:
List of geological phenomena
earthquake, the result of a sudden release of energy in the Earth's crust that creates seismic waves
volcanic eruption

Video games 
World of Warcraft: Cataclysm, an expansion pack of Blizzard Entertainment's World of Warcraft
Cataclysm: Dark Days Ahead, an open-source cross-platform roguelike video game
Homeworld: Cataclysm, a stand-alone expansion, of the Homeworld space-based RTS franchise

Books and comics 
Cataclysm (Dragonlance), a fictional event in the Dragonlance novels
Batman: Cataclysm, a DC Comics crossover story arc featuring Batman
 Cataclysm: The Ultimates' Last Stand a 2013-2014 crossover storyline appearing in the Ultimate Marvel line of books
 Godzilla: Cataclysm - see Godzilla (comics)#IDW Publishing

Other uses 
 A special ability used by Cat Noir, a character in Miraculous: Tales of Ladybug & Cat Noir
 "Cataclysmic", a song by Joe Satriani from his album Shockwave Supernova

See also 
 Cataclysmic variable star, which irregularly increase in brightness by a large factor, then drop back down to a quiescent state (initially called novae)
Ekpyrosis, a conflagration
Eschatology